The Korean independence movement was a military and diplomatic campaign to achieve the independence of Korea from Japan. After the Japanese annexation of Korea in 1910, Korea's domestic resistance peaked in the March 1st Movement of 1919, which was crushed and sent Korean leaders to flee into China. In China, Korean independence activists built ties with the National Government of the Republic of China which supported the Provisional Government of the Republic of Korea (KPG), as a government in exile. At the same time, the Korean Liberation Army, which operated under the Chinese National Military Council and then the KPG, led attacks against Japan.

After the outbreak of the Pacific War in 1941, China became one of the Allies of World War II. In the Second Sino-Japanese War, China attempted to use this influence to assert Allied recognition of the KPG. However, the United States was skeptical of Korean unity and readiness for independence, preferring an international trusteeship-like solution for the Korean Peninsula. Although China achieved agreement by the Allies on eventual Korean independence in the Cairo Declaration of 1943, continued disagreement and ambiguity about the postwar Korean government lasted until the Soviet–Japanese War of 1945 created a de facto division of Korea into Soviet and American zones, eventually leading to the Korean War (1950-1953).

August 15, the date of the Surrender of Japan in 1945, is an annual holiday called Gwangbokjeol ("Restoration of Light Day") in South Korea, and Chogukhaebangŭi nal ("Fatherland Liberation Day") in North Korea.

History

Before Japanese rule

The last independent Korean monarchy, the Joseon dynasty, lasted over 500 years (from 1392 to 1910), both as the Joseon Kingdom and later as the Empire of Korea. Its international status and policies were conducted primarily through careful diplomatic maneuvering with the power en vogue in China (during this period of time dynastic control of China saw the end of the Yuan dynasty and the rise and fall of both the Ming dynasty and the Qing dynasty), though other interactions with other international entities were not absent. Through this maneuvering and a dedicated adherence to strict Neo-Confucianist foreign and domestic policies, Joseon Korea retained control over its internal affairs and relative international autonomy though technically a suzerain of the ruling Chinese dynasties for most of this period under the Chinese tributary system. These policies were effective in maintaining Korea's relative independence and domestic autonomy in spite of a number of regional upheavals and a number of invasions (including the Japanese invasions of Korea from 1592–98 as well as the First and Second Manchu invasions of Korea).

However, in the late 19th and early 20th centuries, with the increase of Western imperialism, the weakening of China also made Korea vulnerable to foreign maneuvering and encroachment, both as a target in and of itself and as a stepping-stone to the "larger prize" of China. This period (roughly from 1870 until annexation by Japan in 1910) was marked in Korea by major upheavals, many intrigues, the inability of Joseon Korea and the later Empire of Korea to right itself amidst all of the maneuvering around it by foreign powers, numerous revolts, and other indicators of a turbulent time. By the end of the First Sino-Japanese War in 1895 it was evident internationally that China could no longer protect its foreign interests, much less its own, against its opponents, and that its attempts to modernize its military and institutions were unsuccessful.

Among other things, the Treaty of Shimonoseki that ended the First Sino-Japanese War in 1895 stipulated that China would relinquish suzerainty and influence over Korea, recognize Korea's full independence and autonomy, and end the tribute system which had linked China and Korea for many centuries. In practical reality, this stipulation implied the handover of primary outside influence in Korea from China to Japan, as Japanese forces had occupied positions in the Korean Peninsula during the course of the war. This paved the way for the Japanese government to tighten its influence on Korea without official Chinese intervention. Korea was declared to be an empire in 1897 to put King Gojong on equal legal footing with his neighboring sovereigns and to fully sever Korea's superficial ties of suzerainty to China, however In 1905 the Eulsa Treaty made the Empire of Korea a protectorate of Japan. In 1907, the Japan–Korea Treaty of 1907 stipulated that Korea's policies would be enacted and enforced under the guidance of the Japanese resident general; and in 1910, through the Japan–Korea Annexation Treaty, Japan officially declared its annexation of Korea, a move for which Japan had been preparing for an extended period of time. All of these treaties were procured under duress, and Emperor Sunjong of Korea refused to sign them and considered them illegal and not binding (though he had no real power to oppose its enactment and enforcement).

Notably, both the 1905 treaty (and by extension the 1907 treaty) and the 1910 annexation treaty were declared "already null and void" when the normalization of relations between the Republic of Korea and Japan was negotiated in 1965.

Japanese rule

The period of Japanese colonial rule that ensued was oppressive to a far-reaching degree, giving rise to many Korean resistance movements. By 1919 these became nationwide, marked by what became known as the March 1st Movement.

Japanese rule was oppressive but changed over time. Initially, there was very harsh repression in the decade following annexation. Japan's rule was markedly different than in its other colony, Formosa. This period is referred to as amhukki (the dark period) in Korean historiography and common parlance in Korea. Tens of thousands of Koreans were arrested by the Japanese colonial administration for political reasons. The harshness of Japanese rule increased support for the Korean independence movement. Many Koreans left the Korean Peninsula for Manchuria and Primorsky Krai in Russia, some of whom formed resistance groups and societies in Manchuria to fight for Korean independence. Koreans also carried out armed struggles against Japanese forces in Manchuria and Korea. In 1919 and 1920s, Korean independence army units engaged in resistance activities in Manchuria, which traveled across the Korean-Chinese border, using guerrilla warfare to fight against the Japanese army. Some went to Japan, where groups agitated clandestinely. There was a prominent group of Korean Communists in Japan, who were in danger for their political activities.

Partly due to Korean opposition to Japanese colonial policies, this was followed by a relaxation of some harsh policies. The Korean crown prince married the Japanese princess Nashimoto. The ban on Korean newspapers was lifted, allowing publication of Choson Ilbo and The Dong-a Ilbo. Korean government workers received the same wages as Japanese officials, though the Japanese officials received bonuses the Koreans did not. Whippings were eliminated for minor offenses but not for others. Laws interfering with burial, slaughtering of animals, peasant markets, or traditional customs were removed or changed.

After the Peace Preservation Law of 1925, some freedoms were restricted. Then, in the lead up to the invasion of China and World War II, the harshness of Japanese rule increased again.

World War II diplomacy
Although the Empire of Japan had invaded and occupied northeast China from 1931, the Nationalist Government of China avoided declaring war on Japan until the Empire directly attacked Beijing in 1937, sparking the Second Sino-Japanese War. After the United States declared war on Japan in 1941, China became an Ally of World War II, and tried to exercise its influence within the group to support Pan-Asian and nationalist movements, which included stipulating a demand of the complete surrender of Japan and immediate independence of Korea afterwards.

China tried to promote the legitimacy of the Provisional Government of Korea (KPG), which was established by Korean exiles in China after the suppression of the March 1st Movement in Korea. The KPG was ideologically aligned with the Chinese government of the time, as independence leader Kim Gu had agreed to Chiang Kai-shek's suggestion to adopt the Chinese Three Principles of the People program in exchange for financial aid. At the same time, China supported the leftist independence leader Kim Won-bong and convinced the two Kims to form the unified Korean Liberation Army (KLA). Under the terms in which the KLA was allowed to operate in China, it became an auxiliary of China's National Revolutionary Army until 1945. China's National Military Council had also decided that "complete independence" for Korea was China's fundamental Korean policy; otherwise, the government in Chongqing tried to unify the warring Korean factions.

Although Chiang and Korean leaders like Syngman Rhee tried to influence the U.S. State Department to support Korean independence and recognize the KPG, the Far Eastern Division was skeptical. Its argument was that the Korean people "were emasculated politically" after decades of Japanese rule, and showed too much disunity, preferring a condominium solution for Korea that involved the Soviets. China was adamantly opposed to Soviet influence in Korea after hearing about Soviet atrocities in Poland since its liberation. By the Cairo Conference, the US and China came to agree on Korean independence "in due course", with China still pressing for immediate recognition of the exile government and a tangible date for independence. After Soviet-American relations deteriorated, on August 10, 1945 the United States Department of War agreed that China should land troops in Pusan, Korea from which to prevent a Soviet takeover. However, this turnaround was too late to prevent the division of Korea, as the Red Army quickly occupied northern Korea that same month.

Ideologies and concerns
Although there were many separate movements against colonial rule, the main ideology or purpose of the movement was to free Korea from the Japanese military and political rule. Koreans were concerned with alien domination and Korea’s state as a colony. They desired to restore Korea's independent political sovereignty after Japan invaded the weakened and partially modernized Korean Empire. This was the result of Japan's political maneuvers to secure international approval for the annexation of treaty annexing Korea.
During the independence movement, the rest of the world viewed what was occurring in Korea as an anti-imperialist, anti-militarist, and an anti-Japanese resistance movement. Koreans, however, saw the movement as a step to free Korea from the Japanese military rule.

The South Korean government has been criticized as recently as 2011 for not accepting Korean socialists who fought for Korean independence.

Tactics
There was no main strategy or tactic that was prevalent throughout the resistance movement, but there were stages where certain tactics or strategies were prominent.

From 1905 to 1910, most of the movement’s activities were closed off to the elite class or rare scholar. During this time, militaristic and violent attempts were taken to resist the Japanese including assassination. Most of the attempts were disorganized, scattered, and leaderless to prevent arrests and surveillance by the Japanese.

From 1910 to 1919, was a time of education during the colonial era. Many Korean textbooks on grammar and spelling were circulated in schools. It started the trend of intellectual resistance to Japanese colonial rule. This period, along with Woodrow Wilson’s progressive principles abroad, created an aware, nationalist, and eager student population. After the March 1st movement of 1919, strikes became prominent in the movement. Up to 1945, universities were used as a haven and source of students who further supported the movement. This support system led to the improvement of school facilities. From 1911 to 1937, Korea was dealing with economic problems (with the rest of the world, going through the Great Depression after World War I). There were many labor complaints that contributed to the grievances against Japan’s colonial rule. During this period, there were 159,061 disputes with workers concerned with wages and 1018 disputes involving 68,686 farmers in a tenant position. In 1926 the disputes started to increase at a fast pace and movements concerning labor emerged more within the Independence Movement.

Types of movements
There were broadly three kinds of national liberation groups: (a) the Christian groups which grew out of missionary efforts led by Western missionaries primarily from the United States prior to the Japanese occupation; (b) the former military and the irregular army groups; and (c) business and intellectual expatriates who formed the theoretical and political framework abroad.

Religious groups
Catholicism arrived in Korea towards the end of the 18th century, facing intense persecution for the centuries afterwards. Methodist and Presbyterian missionaries followed in the 19th century starting off a renaissance with more liberal thoughts on issues of equality and woman's rights, which the strict Confucian tradition would not permit.

The early Korean Christian missionaries both led the Korean independence movement active from 1890 through 1907, and later the creation of a Korean liberation movement from 1907 to 1945. Korean Christians suffered martyrdoms, crucifixions, burnings to death, police interrogations and massacres by the Japanese.

Amongst the major religious nationalist groups were:

 Korean Presbyterian church
 March 1 Movement
 Korean YMCA

Military and the Irregular army groups
 Donghak Peasant Revolution: Donghak armies were spontaneous countryside uprisings, originally against corruption in the late Joseon dynasty, and later, against Japanese confiscation of lands in Korea.
 Righteous army: Small armies that fought Japanese military police, cavalry, and infantry most intensely from 1907–1918, but which carried on till the end of World War II.
Greater Korea Independence Army
Northern Military Administration Office Army
Greater Korea Independence Corps
Korea Revolution Army
Korea Independence Army
Korean Volunteer Corps
Korean Volunteer Army
Korean Liberation Army: The Armed Forces of the Provisional Government of the Republic of Korea, took part in allied action in China and parts of Southern East Asia such as Burma.
Korean Patriotic Legion
Heroic Corps
Supporters of these groups included French, Czech, Chinese, and Russian arms merchants, as well as Chinese nationalist movements.

Expatriate groups
Expatriate liberation groups were active in Shanghai, northeast China, parts of Russia, Hawaii, San Francisco, and Los Angeles. Groups were even organised in areas without many expatriate Koreans, such as the one established in 1906 in Colorado by Park Hee Byung. The culmination of expatriate success was the Shanghai declaration of independence.

 Korean National Association
 Korean National Army Corps, founded in June 1914. (Hawaii) 
 Young Korean Academy

Sun Yat-sen was an early supporter of Korean struggles against Japanese invaders. By 1925, Korean expatriates began to cultivate two-pronged support in Shanghai: from Chiang Kai-Shek's Kuomintang, and from early communist supporters, who later branched into the Chinese Communist Party.

Little real support came through, but that which did develop long-standing relationships that contributed to the dividing of Korea after 1949, and the polar positions between south and north.

Royalist influence
The constant infighting within the Yi family, the nobles, the confiscation of royal assets, the disbanding of the royal army by the Japanese, the execution of seniors within Korea by Japan, comprehensive assassinations of Korean royalty by Japanese mercenaries, and surveillance by Japanese authorities led to great difficulties in royal descendants and their family groups in finding anything but a partial leadership within the liberation movement. A good many of the righteous army commanders were linked to the family but these generals and their righteous army groups were largely dead by 1918, and cadet members of the families contributed towards establishing both republics post-1945.

List of notable leaders of the movements

Before Annexation Period
Yi Han-eung
Choe Ik-hyeon
Min Yeong-hwan
Shin Dol-seok
Yi Tjoune
Yi Wi-jong
Choe Sihyeong

Provisional Government
Ahn Chang Ho
Hong Jin (Hong Myun-hui)
Jo So-ang
Kim Gu
Kim Kyu-sik
Lee Beom-seok
No Baek-rin
Park Eunsik
Syngman Rhee
Yang Gi-tak
Yi Dong-hwi
Yi Dong-nyung
Yi Sang-ryong

Edification movement leaders
Ahn Chang Ho
Han Kyu-seol
Jeong Jong-myeong
Cho Man-sik
Yi Sang-jae
Yi Sang-seol

Leaders who engaged in armed struggle

An Jung-geun

An Gong-geun
Choi Jae-hyung
Choi Jin-dong
Jo Do-seon
Yoo Dong-ha
Kang Woo-kyu
Jang In-hwan
Jeon Myeong-un
Cho Myung-ha
Kim Ik-sang
Kim Ji-seop
Kim Sang-ok
Lee Bong-chang
Lee Hoe-yeong
Na Seok-ju
Park Jae-hyeok
Park Yeol
Pyeon Gang-ryeol
Yoon Bong-Gil
Gu Young-pil
Kim Sang-yoon
Park Byeong-gil
Park Jang-ho
Baek Nam-sik
Baek Jung Gi
Yeom Dong-jin
Woo Deok-soon
Lee Seong-rim
In Han-soo
Chaechan
Kim Si-hyun
Lee Gu-yeon
Lee Jung-gu
Lim Chi-jung
Kim Doo-hwa
Won Tae-woo
Jeongshin
Chae Eung-eon
Han Sang-ryeol
Han Hoon
Hwang Byeong-gil
Ma Man-bong
Jang Gi-cho
Choe Ja-nam
Hyun Ik-cheol
Cho Maeng-seon
Lee Joon-yong
Im Deuk-san
Jang Chang-heon
Lee Jin-ryong
Kim Rip
Ok Kwan-bin
Oh Seong-ryun
Lee Jong-am
Kim Bong-hwan
Lee Kwang-su
Lee Hye-su
Hyun Joon-hyuk
Ahn Doo-hee
Kim Jong-suk
Hong Beom-do
Jeong Jin-ryong
Na Cheol
Kang Won-sang
Lee Kang
Lee Gyu-pung
Lee Beom-yoon
Won Tae-geun
Bae Gyeong-jin
Kim Seong-hwa
Tak Gong-gyu
Yoo Seung-ryeol
Kim Hong-il
Lee Gyeong-hee
Yang Geun-hwan
Yoo Seok-hyun
An Gyeong-shin
Lee Cheol
Hong Pil-ju
Oh Gi-ho
Kim In-sik
Kim Dong-pil
Lee Hong-rae
Kim Kwang-chu
Park Hee-kwang
Kim Byeong-hyun
Lee Jae-myeong
Seo Sang-han
Na Chang-heon
Kim Chang-geun
Lee Jun-yong
Kim Tae-won
Lee Yong-dam
Joo Sang-ok
Kim Taek-su
Jeong Chang-hwa
Baek Un-han
Lee Myeong-seo
Kim Geun-ha
Ham Il
Kim Jin-hwa
Lee Gi
Noh Eung-gyu
Seo Eun-gu
Eom Hae-yoon
Noh Gong-il
Kim Choe-myeong
Han Bong-su
Kang Sang-mo
Kang Lee-bong
Moon Tae-su
Shin Myeong-seon
Kim Dong-shin
Kang Jin-won
Ko Du-hwan
Kwon Young-man
Keum Gi-cheol
Han Sang-seol
Kim Hyeon-guk
Woo Jae-ryong
Kim Deok-soon
Kim Dong-sik
Kim Man-su
Kim Beom-i
Kim Byeong-rok
Kim Bong-won
Kim Bong-hak
Kim Seong-beom
Kim Si-jung
Lee Kang-nyeon
Kim Sang-tae
Kim Young-cheol
Kim Seong-taek
Hwang Byung-hak
Kim Eung-baek
Kim Lee-seop
Kim Il-won
Kim Su-gok
Yun Heung-gon
Kim Jeong-ik
Cho Chang-ho
Jeon Tae-seon
Lee Dong-su
Kim I-geol
Kim Jong-cheol
Kim Jin-man
Park Sang-jin
Kim Jin-woo
Jeong Un-il
Choi Byung-gyu
Kim Jin-jun
Cho Chang-ryong
Kim Chang-gon
Ko Bong-jun
Kim Han-jong
Kim Gyeong-tae
Im Bong-ju
Kwon Sang-seok
Jang Doo-hwan
Na Byeong-sam
Kim Han
Moon Chang-hak
Park Gi-han
Lee Tak
Cha Byeong-je
Son Chang-jun
Lee Woo-young
An Gyeong-sik
Joo Byeong-ung
Park Jin-tae
Park Gi-je
Park Do-gyeong
Park Bong-seok
Park Yeon-baek
Park In-hwa
Park Jung-seo
Min Yang-gi
Seo Byung-hee
Seong Ik-hyun
Son Deok-oh
Song Hak-seon
Yeo Haeng-ryeol
Yoon Heung-gon
Lee Kwang-ho
Lee Kyo-young
Lee Seong-gu
Cha Do-seon
Tae Yang-uk
Hong Sung-ik
Lee Myeong-gyun
Cho Seong-hwan
Chae Sang-deok
Kang Mu-gyeong
Kim Won-guk
Kim Jun-seung
Noh Jong-gyun
Moon Yang-mok
Choi Jeong-ik
Jeong Jae-gwan
Lee Hak-hyun
Baek Nak-ju
Seo Il
Kim Chwa-chin
Sim Nam-il
An Kwang-jo
Oh Seung-tae
An Gyu-hong
Jeong Ki-chan
Ahn Byung-chan
Yang Seung-woo
Oh Sung-sul
Yoo Jang-ryeol
Lee Hyeon-gyu

Military leaders
An Jung-geun
Hong Beom-do
Hwang Byeong-gil
Ji Cheong-cheon
Kim Dubong
Kim Jwa-jin
Kim Wonbong
Lee Beom-seok
Nam Ja-hyun
Park Yong-man
Seo Il
Seo Yun-je
Yang Sebong
Yun Se-ju
Bang Kyung-han
Kim Il-Sung
Choi Jin Dong

Religion/Student leaders
Han Yong-un
Kim Maria
Son Byong Hi

Yu Gwansun
Choe Sang-rim
Lee Yong-do
Gye Ji-pung
Kim Gyo-shin
Kim Dong-seok
Kim Beop-rin
Kim Seong-su
Na Geum-ju
Mangong
Park Sun-cheon
Park Young-hee
Park Hyeong-mu
Seo Yun-je
An Sang-deok
An Jeong-geun
Yun Chi-young
Lee Un-hyeong
Lee Jong-uk
Lee Chu-hyeong
Jeon Deok-gi
Cho Gi-shin
Chu Ki-chol
Cha Mirisa
Cha Sang-myeong
Choe Yong-shin
Hwang Ae-deok
Lee Su-heung
Ham Tae-young
Kim Iryeop
Baek Seong-uk
Gil Seon-ju
Kim Byeong-cho
Park Hee-do
Yongseong
Son Byong-hi
Shin Seok-gu
Oh Se-chang
Lee Seung-hoon
Han Yong-un
Kim Gyo-heon
Kim Kyu-sik
Jonghyeong
Yoon Se-bok
Jo So-ang

Historians
An Jae-hong
Choe Nam-seon
Jeong Inbo
Mun Il-pyeong
Park Eunsik
Shin Chae-ho
Song Nam-heon
Song Du-yong

Writers/Poets
Sim Hun
Yi Yuksa (Yi Wonnok)
Yun Dong-ju
Soh Jaipil
Kang Kyeong-ae
Gong Deok-gwi
Gwak Sang-hoon
Kim Kwang-seop
Kim Gyo-shin
Kim Seong-suk
Kim Jun-yop
Kim Hyun-chul
Baek Gwan-su
Mirok Li
Yi Sang-baek
Lee Jong-hak
Lee Hee-seung
Jang Do-bin
Chu Yo-han
Choe Du-seon
Heo Jeong
Hyun Jin-geon
Hong Seung-ro
Jung Nosik
Kim Myeong-sun
Na Hye-sok
Park In-deok
Chung Chil-sung
Lee Jong-il
Han Yong-un
Kim Dong-sam
Kim Yak-yeon
Kim Chwa-chin
Sin Ik-hui
Lee Beom-seok
An Jae-hong

Communist leaders
Kim Il-Sung
Pak Hon-yong, a noted communist leader
Yuh Woon-Hyung associated with Communists during the 20s, but later left
Gye Bong-woo
Kim Dan-ya
Kim San
Kim Yak-su
Kim Jae-bong
Kim Jun-yeon
Na Kyung-seok
Yoo Jin-hee
Yun Gong-heum
Yun Ja-young
Im Won-geun
Ju Se-juk
Cha Geum-bong
Choe Chang-ik
Ho Ka-i
Ho Jong-suk
Ho Hon
Hyun Jeong-gyeong
Kang Kon
Kim Kwang-hyop
Kim Tu-bong
Mu Chong
Kim Yong-bom
Kim Ung
Kim Won-bong
Kim Il
Kim Chang-man
Kim Chaek
Ryu Gyeong-su
Yi Kang-guk
Lee Hyo-sun
Pak Kum-chol
Bang Ho-san
Paek Nam-Un
Sung Jusik
Oh Hwa-young
Yi Kuk-no
Lee Hyun-sang
Cho Myeong-seon
Choe Deok-sin
Choe Yong-dal
Choein
Choe Hyon
Ho Song-taek
Hong Myong-hui
Hwang Tae-seong
Kim Jong-suk
Choerin
Mun Si-hwan
Lee yung
Yi Dong-hwi
Hong Beom-do
Kang Hae-seok
Kang Young-seok
Byeon Hee-yong
Bang Joon-pyo
Kang Dal-young
Jeong Jin-ryong
Tjyongoui Yi

Foreign supporters
Chiang Kai-shek
Ernest Bethell
Frank Schofield
Fumiko Kaneko
George Show
Homer Hulbert
Sun Yat-sen
Vladimir Lenin
Chou En-lai
Mao Tse-tung
Tatsuji Fuse

See also

Korean nationalism
History of Korea
Provisional Government of the Republic of Korea
March 1st Movement
June 10th Movement
Gwangju Student Independence Movement
Korean Liberation Army
Battle of Qingshanli
Battle of Fengwudong

References

Jin Y. Park, ed. 'Makers of Modern Korean Buddhism'Albany: State University of New York Press, 2009

External links

 Brief article on Korean Independence from Japanese Press Translations, Dartmouth College Library

Republicanism in Korea
 
20th century in Korea
Japan–Korea relations
Foreign relations of the Republic of China (1912–1949)
Anti-sadaejuui